John Smith McInnes (11 August 1927 – October 1973) was a Scottish professional footballer who played as a winger.

Career
Born in Glasgow, McInnes played for Morton, Chelsea and Bedford Town.

References

1927 births
1973 deaths
Scottish footballers
Greenock Morton F.C. players
Chelsea F.C. players
Bedford Town F.C. players
Scottish Football League players
English Football League players
Association football wingers